Bae Yong-Kyun (born 1951 in Daegu, Gyeongsangbuk-do, South Korea) is a South Korean film director, painter, and professor.  He is best known for his Seon(Zen)-influenced 1989 film Dharmaga tongjoguro kan kkadalgun (Why Has Bodhi-Dharma Left for the East, 달마가 동쪽으로 간 까닭은). He also wrote and directed one other film, Geomeuna dange huina baekseong (The People in White, 1995).

Bae is a painter by training. He holds a doctorate and serves as an art professor in South Korea.

See also
List of Korean film directors
Korean cinema
Contemporary culture of South Korea

External links

 General information about Bae Yong-gyun at the Cine21
 Detailed information about Bae Yong-gyun at the KMDb

Living people
1951 births
South Korean film directors
Buddhism in Korea
People from Daegu
20th-century South Korean painters
21st-century South Korean painters
Buddhist artists